Events in the year 1943 in Portugal.

Incumbents
President: Óscar Carmona
Prime Minister: António de Oliveira Salazar

Events
August – Luso-British agreement is signed, leasing air basis in the Azores to the UK.

Arts and entertainment
28 November – First issue of the weekly newspaper O Benfica

Sports
GD Bragança founded
Santa Maria FC founded

Births

5 February – Manuel Luís dos Santos, footballer
19 February – Amandio Malta da Silva, footballer
22 February – Antônio Lino da Silva Dinis, Bishop of Itumbiara (died 2013). 
20 March – Alice Vieira, children's writer. 
25 June – Serafim Pereira, footballer (died 1994)
3 September – Marinho, footballer
2 October – Eduardo Serra, cinematographer
28 October – João Aguiar, journalist and novelist (died 2010)
18 November – Manuel António Pina, journalist and poet (died 2012)

Deaths

10 January – Manuel Maria Coelho, military officer and politician (born 1857)
11 March – Infanta Maria Josepha of Portugal (born 1857)
May – Dom Aleixo Timorese, war hero of East Timor (born 1886)

References

 
1940s in Portugal
Portugal
Years of the 20th century in Portugal
Portugal